Kim Seol-hyun (born January 3, 1995), better known by her mononym Seolhyun, is a South Korean singer and actress. She is a former member of the South Korean girl group AOA and she has starred in television dramas Orange Marmalade (2015), My Country: The New Age (2019), Awaken (2020–2021) and film Memoir of a Murderer (2017).

Early life and education 
Seolhyun was born on January 3, 1995, in Bucheon, South Korea. She has an older sister named Joo-hyun, who is a fashion editor for Cosmopolitan. She attended Kachiul Elementary School, Sungkok Middle School and Gyeonggi Arts High School.

Career

2012–2014: AOA and acting debut

In 2010, Seolhyun won the 8th Smart Model Contest (스마트 모델 선발 대회), a competition in which ordinary students wear uniforms. At the event, several talent agencies were present, and Seolhyun was scouted by her current management, FNC Entertainment. She has also appeared in the music video for boy band F.T. Island's song "Severely" from the EP Grown-Up.

On July 30, 2012, Seolhyun made her debut as a member of AOA on Mnet's M Countdown with the song "Elvis" from their debut single album, Angels' Story. Soon afterwards, she made her acting debut in the television drama My Daughter Seo-young, playing the role of Lee Jung-shin's girlfriend.

In 2013, she was cast in the daily drama Ugly Alert. She played the youngest daughter of the family, a bright girl who dreams of becoming an actress. Seolhyun stated, "I'm nervous about doing a new project, and I'm also burdened. But I want to work hard again by thinking of it as another learning experience. I also want to touch the hearts of people".

2015–present: Acting roles and rising popularity
Seolhyun first attracted attention with her appearance on the KBS variety show, Brave Family (2015), where she charmed viewers with boyish and unaffected demeanor. Later that year, she gained fame through a commercial for SK Telecom which led to increased advertising offers for the star.

The same year, Seolhyun starred in KBS's vampire romance Orange Marmalade. Although it racked a mere two percent viewer ratings, the show brought her praise for her acting. She also featured in the action noir film Gangnam Blues, and won a "popular star" award at the 36th Blue Dragon Film Awards. Seolhyun, along with Gangnam co-star Lee Min-ho were selected as promotional ambassadors for "Visit Korea Year".

In January 2016, Seolhyun was named “Model of the Year” at the 2015 TVCF Awards; having modeled for noteworthy brands across industries such as fashion, food and beverage, cosmetics and e-commerce. She placed second in a study conducted by Korea Broadcast Advertising Corporation (Kobaco) to select the top spokesmodel by consumers. In March 2016, Seolhyun was selected as an official ambassador to Korea national elections in 2016.

In May 2017, Seolhyun was cast in historical film The Great Battle, directed by Kim Kwang-sik. Principal photography started in August and the film premiered in 2018. She then starred in the thriller Memoir of a Murderer, playing the role of a murderer's daughter.

In 2019, Seolhyun was cast as female lead in JTBC's historical drama My Country. This marks her first small-screen role in four years.

In 2020, Seolhyun was cast in tvN's romantic mystery drama Awaken, which aired November 30, 2020.

At the end of 2021, Seolhyun hosted the KBS Song Festival along with Cha Eun-woo and Rowoon.

In October 2022, Seolhyun decided not to renew her contract with FNC Entertainment. In November, Seolhyun signed with Ieum Hashtag.

Personal life

Philanthropy
In February 2018, Kim and CNBLUE's Lee Jung-shin traveled to Kalaw, Myanmar to volunteer at the 4th LOVE FNC school for underprivileged children.

Filmography

Film

Television series

Television show

Hosting

Awards and nominations

Listicles

See also 
 AOA discography

References

External links 

 
 

AOA (group) members
1995 births
Living people
K-pop singers
South Korean female idols
South Korean women pop singers
South Korean female models
South Korean television personalities
South Korean film actresses
South Korean television actresses
Mandarin-language singers of South Korea
Japanese-language singers of South Korea
Actresses from Seoul
People from Bucheon
21st-century South Korean actresses
Singers from Seoul